Marshall A. Burt (born May 6, 1976) is an American politician who served in the Wyoming House of Representatives. A member of the Libertarian Party, Burt represented the 39th district from 2021 to 2023.

Burt is the first Libertarian candidate to be elected to a state legislature since Steve Vaillancourt in 2000, and the first third-party candidate elected to the Wyoming Legislature in over 100 years. Burt was defeated by Republican Cody Wylie in the 2022 Wyoming House of Representatives election.

Early life and career 
Burt was born in Rochester, Minnesota. He is a U.S. Marine Corps veteran, having served nine years in Okinawa, Japan, and in the Iraq War. He is employed by the Union Pacific Railroad as a track inspector.

Wyoming House of Representatives

Elections

2020 

In the 2020 Wyoming House of Representatives election, Burt was one of six Wyoming Libertarian candidates running in competitive districts. Burt ran in the 39th district. In a two-way race, Burt defeated his Democratic opponent, longtime incumbent Stan Blake, receiving 53.6% of the vote to Blake's 44.9%.

2022 

Burt ran for re-election in the 2022 Wyoming House of Representatives election against Republican Cody Wylie. Burt was defeated by Wylie, receiving 25% of the vote to Wylie's 75%.

Tenure 
In March 2021, Burt alongside a bipartisan group of house members, co–sponsored legislation that legalizes the sale, purchase, possession, and cultivation of cannabis, for any Wyoming citizen over the age of twenty–one. The bill missed its deadline to be considered by the house after a committee voted to approve it, so it died on the house floor.

A bill identical to the March 2021 bill that would legalize cannabis was reintroduced in February 2022. Burt, once again, alongside a bipartisan group of house members, co–sponsored this legislation.

On February 16, 2022, Speaker Eric Barlow recognized the Libertarian Party as a minority party in the House, and Burt became the chairman of the Libertarian caucus.

Committee assignments 
 Wyoming House Committee on Transportation, Highways and Military Affairs
 Joint Subcommittee on Interstate Compact on Students of Military Families
Wyoming House Committee on Corporations, Elections & Political Subdivisions

Political positions

Gun policy 
Burt is a gun-rights supporter and opposes expanding gun control regulations. He opposes all gun registration and instant background checks, and calls for "no permit or residency required for either open or concealed carry [in the state of Wyoming]."

Healthcare 
Burt opposes federal and state vaccine mandates, calling them "unconstitutional".

Personal life 
Burt lives in Green River, Wyoming, with his wife, Theresa Burt and his two children. He is a Lutheran.

Electoral history

References

External links 
 
 

1976 births
Living people
21st-century American politicians
Members of the Wyoming House of Representatives
Military personnel from Minnesota
People from Green River, Wyoming
People from Pine Island, Minnesota
Wyoming Libertarians
Libertarian Party (United States) officeholders